Barton Outram (15 July 1886 – 5 April 1974) was a Barbadian cricketer. He played in two first-class matches for the Barbados cricket team in 1903/04.

See also
 List of Barbadian representative cricketers

References

External links
 

1886 births
1974 deaths
Barbadian cricketers
Barbados cricketers
People from Saint John, Barbados